This is the German Army order of battle on the outbreak of World War I in August 1914.

Commanders and locations of the German Army
The overall commander of the Imperial German Army was Kaiser Wilhelm II. The Chief of the General Staff was Generaloberst Helmuth von Moltke the Younger, with General Hermann von Stein as Deputy Chief. The Departmental chiefs were Oberst Tappen (Operations Branch), Oberstleutnant Hentsch (Intelligence Branch), Major Nicolai (Secret Service), Oberst von Dommes (Political Section), Generalleutnant Siger (Field munitions), Major Thomsen (Air Service), Oberst Groner (Field Railways),  General von Lauter(Foot Artillery), General von Claer was General of Engineers, and General von Schjerning (Medical Services). Generalmajor von Schoeler was Intendant-General (responsible for logistical supplies).

Homeland corps deployments (1871-1914)
During times of war in Germany, all military forces came under the direct command of the German Emperor, via Article 60 of the Constitution of the German Reich (1871). From 1871 to 1918, the forces of the Emperor included those of the kingdoms of Prussia, Bavaria, Saxony and Württemberg, with all other states commanded by, or merged with his Prussian army.

Western Front

Cavalry

Four independent cavalry corps served on the Western Front. These had the following order of battle:

I Cavalry Corps (preceding 3rd Army)

Commander: General der Kavallerie Manfred Freiherr von Richthofen

Chief of Staff: Oberst von Raumer
 Guards Cavalry Division (General Adolf von Storch)
 5th Cavalry Division (General Karl von Ilsemann)
II Cavalry Corps (preceding 1st and 2nd Armies)

Commander: General der Kavallerie Georg von der Marwitz

Chief of Staff: Major Hoffmann von Waldau
 2nd Cavalry Division (General Friedrich FH von Krane)
 4th Cavalry Division (General Otto von Garnier)
 9th Cavalry Division (General Karl Hans von Bülow)
III Cavalry Corps (preceding 6th Army)

Commander: General der Kavallerie Rudolf Ritter von Frommel

Chief of Staff: Major von Meiß
 7th Cavalry Division (General Ernst von Heydebreck)
 8th Cavalry Division (General Günther Graf von der Schulenburg-Hehlen)
 Bavarian Cavalry Division (Generalleutnant Otto von Stetten)
IV Cavalry Corps (preceding 4th and 5th Armies)

Commander: General der Kavallerie Gustav Freiherr von Hollen

Chief of Staff: Oberstleutnant Otto von Brandenstein
 3rd Cavalry Division (General Kurt von Unger)
 6th Cavalry Division (General Egon Graf von Schmettow)
Each Cavalry Division consisted of 3 Brigades, each of 2 Cavalry Regiments (24 squadrons total), 3 horse artillery batteries (4 guns each) and an MG detachment (6 MGs).

First Army
1st Army had the following order of battle:

Commander: Generaloberst Alexander von Kluck

Chief of Staff: Generalmajor Hermann von Kuhl

Oberquartiermaster: Oberst Walter von Bergmann

HQ: Grevenbroich, Germany

Strength: 320,000

II Corps 
Commander: General der Infanterie Alexander von Linsingen

Chief of Staff: Oberst Hans von Hammerstein-Gesmold
 3rd Infantry Division (Generalleutnant Kurt Eduard von Trossel)
 4th Infantry Division (Generalleutnant Günther von Pannewitz)

III Corps 
Commander: General der Infanterie Ewald von Lochow

Chief of Staff: Oberstleutnant Hans von Seeckt
 5th Infantry Division (Generalleutnant Georg Wichura)
 6th Infantry Division (Generalmajor Richard Herhudt von Rohden)

IV Corps 
Commander: General der Infanterie Friedrich Bertram Sixt von Armin

Chief of Staff: Generalmajor Leo von Stocken
 7th Infantry Division (Generalleutnant Johannes Riedel)
 8th Infantry Division (Generalleutnant Georg Karl August Hildebrandt)

IX Corps 
Commander: General der Infanterie Ferdinand von Quast

Chief of Staff: Oberstleutnant Hans Sydow
 17th Infantry Division (Generalleutnant Arnold von Bauer)
 18th Infantry Division (Generalleutnant Max von Kluge)

III Reserve Corps 
Commander: General der Infanterie Hans von Beseler

Chief of Staff: Oberst Paul Meister
 5th Reserve Division (Generalleutnant Richard Voigt)
 6th Reserve Division (Generalleutnant Emil von Schickfus und Neudorf)

IV Reserve Corps 
Commander: General der Artillerie Hans von Gronau

Chief of Staff: Oberstleutnant Friedrich von der Heyde
 7th Reserve Division (Generalleutnant Bogislav Graf von Schwerin)
 22nd Reserve Division (Generalleutnant Otto Riemann)

Other Forces 
 10th Mixed Landwehr Brigade (Werner von Lenthe)
 11th Mixed Landwehr Brigade (Oberst Hans von Tippelskirch)
 27th Mixed Landwehr Brigade (Viktor Dallmer)
 Pionier Regiment

Second Army
2nd Army had the following order of battle: 

Commander: Generaloberst Karl von Bülow

Chief of Staff: Generalleutnant Otto von Lauenstein

Oberquartiermaster: Generalmajor Erich Ludendorff

HQ: Monschau, Germany

Strength: 260,000

Guards Corps 
Commander: General der Infanterie Karl von Plettenberg

Chief of Staff: Oberstleutnant Friedrich Graf von der Schulenburg
1st Guards Infantry Division (Generalleutnant Oskar von Hutier)
1st Guards Infantry Brigade (Generalmajor Friedrich Leopold von Kleist)
2nd Guards Infantry Brigade (Generalmajor Hans Karl Schach von Wittenau)
1st Guards Field Artillery Brigade (Generalmajor Friedrich von Buddenbrock)
Leib-Garde-Husaren-Regiment (Oberst Georg von Brandenstein)
2nd Guards Infantry Division (Generalleutnant Arnold von Winckler)
3rd Guards Infantry Brigade (Generalmajor Viktor Albrecht)
4th Guards Infantry Brigade (Generalmajor Friedrich von Gontard)
2nd Guards Field Artillery Brigade (Generalmajor Joseph Trimborn)
2. Garde-Ulanen-Regiment (Oberstleutnant Leopold von Maltzahn)

VII Corps 
Commander: General der Kavallerie Karl von Einem

Chief of Staff: Oberst Hans von Wolff
 13th Infantry Division (Generalleutnant Kurt von dem Borne)
 14th Infantry Division (Generalleutnant Paul Fleck)

X Corps 
Commander: General der Infanterie Otto von Emmich

Chief of Staff: Oberst Gustav von der Wenge Graf von Lambsdorff
 19th Infantry Division (Generalleutnant Max Hofmann)
 20th Infantry Division (Generalleutnant Alwin Schmundt)

Guards Reserve Corps 
Commander: General der Artillerie Max von Gallwitz

Chief of Staff: Oberst Paul von Barttenwerffer
 3rd Guards Infantry Division (Generalleutnant Henning von Bonin)
 5th Guards Infantry Brigade (Generalmajor Nikolaus von Below)
 6th Guards Infantry Brigade (Generalmajor Friedrich von Friedeburg)
 3rd Guards Reserve Field Artillery Brigade (Generalmajor Hans Willibald Graf von Schweinitz und Krain Frh von Kauder)
 Guards-Reserve-Ulanen-Regiment (Major Johan Cesar Godefroy-Faerber)
 1st Guards Reserve Division (Generalmajor Viktor Albrecht)
 1st Guards Reserve Brigade (Generalmajor Hans Frh von Langermann und Erlenkamp)
 Garde-Reserve-Infanterie-Regiment Nr. 1 (Oberstleutnant Max Friedrich von Schlechtendal)
 Garde-Reserve-Infanterie-Regiment Nr. 2 (Oberstleutnant Wigand von Cramer)
 Garde-Reserve-Jäger-Bataillon (Major von Gluszewski)
 15th Reseve Infantry Brigade (Oberst Hans von Below)
 Reserve-Infanterie-Regiment Nr. 64 (Oberstleutnant Rudolf von Cramer)
 Reserve-Infanterie-Regiment Nr. 93 (Oberst von Jena)
 Guards Reserve Field Artillery Brigade (Generalmajor Louis Mertens)
 Garde-Reserve-Feldartillerie-Regiment (Oberstleutnant von Bülow)
 3. Garde-Reserve-Feldartillerie-Regiment (Oberstleutnant Goling)
 Garde-Reserve-Dragoner-Regiment (Major von Hofmann)

VII Reserve Corps 
Commander: General der Infanterie Hans von Zwehl

Chief of Staff: Oberstleutnant Hans Hesse
 13th Reserve Division (Generalleutnant Alfred von Kühne)
 25th Reserve Infantry Brigade (Generalleutnant Andreas Wilhelm von Harbou)
 Reserve-Infanterie-Regiment Nr. 13 (Oberstleutnant Johann Edler und Ritter von Braun)
 Reserve-Infanterie-Regiment Nr. 56 (Oberstleutnant von Goetze)
 28th Reserve Infantry Brigade (Generalmajor Karl Johann Neuhauß)
 Reserve-Infanterie-Regiment Nr. 29 (Oberstleutnant Eben)
 Reserve-Infanterie-Regiment Nr. 37 (Oberstleutnant von Flottwell)
 Reserve-Jäger-Bataillon Nr. 7 (Hauptmann von der Groeben)
 Reserve-Feldartillerie-Regiment Nr. 13 (Oberstleutenant Reinecke)
 Reserve-Husaren-Regiment Nr. 5 (Major Hugo von Kayser)
 14th Reserve Division (Generalleutnant Wolfgang von Unger)
 28th Infantry Brigade (Oberst Hermann von Ziegesar)
 Niederrheinisches Füsilier-Regiment Nr. 39 (Oberst Walter von Schönberg)
 8. Lothringisches Infanterie-Regiment Nr. 159 (Obserst Karl von Kraewel)
 27th Reserve Infantry Brigade (Generalleutnant Edwin Sunkel)
 Reserve-Infanterie-Regiment Nr. 16 (Oberstleutnant Siegener)
 Reserve-Infanterie-Regiment Nr. 53 (Oberstleutnant Bötterling)
 Reserve-Feldartillerie-Regiment Nr. 14 (Major Wendt)
 Reserve-Husaren-Regiment Nr. 8 (Major Heyne)

X Reserve Corps 
Commander: General der Infanterie Günther Graf von Kirchbach

Chief of Staff: Oberst Gottfried Marquard
 2nd Guards Reserve Division (Generalleutnant Richard von Süßkind)
 19th Reserve Division (Generalleutnant Max von Bahrfeldt)

Other Forces 
 25th Mixed Landwehr Brigade (Georg Franz von Glasenapp)
 29th Mixed Landwehr Brigade (Viktor von Rosenberg-Lipinski)
 4 Mortar Battalions
 10-cm Gun Battalion
 2 Heavy Coastal Mortar Batteries
 2 Pionier Regiments

Third Army

3rd Army had the following order of battle:

Commander: Generaloberst Max von Hausen

Chief of Staff: Generalmajor Ernst von Hoeppner

Oberquartiermaster: Generalmajor Max Leuthold

Commander of Pioniere: Generalmajor Franz Adams

HQ: Prüm, Germany

Strength: 180,000

XI Corps 
Commander: General der Infanterie Otto von Plüskow

Chief of Staff: Oberst Traugott von Sauberzweig
 22nd Infantry Division (Generalmajor Karl Dieffenbach)
 43rd Infantry Brigade (Generalmajor Walter von Hülsen)
 44th Infantry Brigade (Generalmajor Theodor Nordbeck)
 22nd Field Artillery Brigade (Generalmajor Karl Max Gronau)  
 38th Infantry Division (Generalleutnant Ernst Wagner)
 76th Infantry Brigade (Generalmajor Fritz von Versen)
 83rd Infantry Brigade (Generalmajor Thilo von Hanstein)
 38 Field Artillery Brigade (Generalmajor Otto Krahmer)
 6th (Brandenburg) Cuirassiers "Emperor Nicholas I of Russia" (Oberst Alexander von Poten)

XII (1st Royal Saxon) Corps 
Commander: General der Infanterie Karl d'Elsa

Chief of Staff: Oberstleutnant Hans von Eulitz
 23rd Infantry Division (Generalleutnant Karl von Lindeman)
 32nd Infantry Division (Generalleutnant Horst Edler von der Planitz)

XIX (2nd Royal Saxon) Corps 
Commander: General der Kavallerie Maximilian von Laffert

Chief of Staff: Oberstleutnant Georg Frotscher
 24th Infantry Division
 40th Infantry Division

XII (Royal Saxon) Reserve Corps 
Commander: General der Artillerie Hans von Kirchbach

Chief of Staff: Oberstleutnant Konrad von Koppenfels
 23rd Reserve Division
 24th Reserve Division

Other Forces 
 47th Mixed Landwehr Brigade (Generalleutnant ch.  Carlotto Graf Vitzthum von Eckstaedt)
 Mortar Battalion
 Pionier Regiment

Fourth Army

4th Army had the following order of battle:

Commander: Generaloberst Albrecht, Duke of Württemberg

Chief of Staff: Generalleutnant Walther von Lüttwitz

Oberquartiermaster: Oberst Georg Weidner

HQ: Trier, Germany

Strength: 180,000

VI Corps 
Commander: General der Infanterie Kurt von Pritzelwitz

Chief of Staff: Oberstleutnant Friedrich von Derschau
 11th Infantry Division  (Generalleutnant Richard von Webern)
 12th Infantry Division (Generalleutnant Martin Chales de Beaulieu)

VIII Corps 
Commander: Generalleutnant Erich Tülff von Tschepe und Weidenbach

Chief of Staff: Oberst August von Cramon
 15th Infantry Division (Generalleutnant Julius Riemann)
 16th Infantry Division (Generalleutnant Georg Fuchs)

XVIII Corps 
Commander: General der Infanterie Dedo von Schenck

Chief of Staff: Oberstleutnant Leberecht von Blücher
 21st Infantry Division (Generalmajor Ernst von Oven)
 25th Infantry Division (Generalmajor Viktor Kühne)

VIII Reserve Corps 
Commander: General der Infanterie Wilhelm Freiherr von Egloffstein

Chief of Staff: Oberst Carl Julius Georg Buchholtz
 15th Reserve Division (Generalleutnant Eberhard von Kurowski)
 16th Reserve Division (Generalleutnant Wilhelm Mootz)

XVIII Reserve Corps 
Commander: Generalleutnant Kuno von Steuben

Chief of Staff: Oberst Fritz von Studnitz
 21st Reserve Division (Generalleutnant Hermann von Rampacher)
 25th Reserve Division (Generalleutnant Alexander Torgany)

Other Forces 
 49th Mixed Landwehr Brigade (Hans von Blumenthal)
 2 Mortar Battalions
 Pionier Regiment

Fifth Army

5th Army had following Order of Battle:

Commander: Generalmajor Wilhelm, Crown Prince of Germany

Chief of Staff: Generalleutnant Konstantin Schmidt von Knobelsdorf

Oberquartiermaster: Generalmajor Rogalla von Bieberstein

HQ: Saarbrücken, Germany

Strength: 200,000

V Corps 
Commander: General der Infanterie Hermann von Strantz

Chief of Staff: Oberstleutnant Hans von Kessel
 9th Infantry Division (Generalleutnant Eduard von Below)
 10th Infantry Division (Generalleutnant Robert Kosch)

XIII (Royal Württemberg) Corps 
Commander: General der Infanterie Max von Fabeck

Chief of Staff: Oberstleutnant Friedrich Karl von Loßberg
 26th Infantry Division (Generalleutnant Wilhelm Karl, Duke of Urach)
 27th Infantry Division (Generalleutnant Franz Graf von Pfeil und Klein-Ellguth)

XVI Corps 
Commander: General der Infanterie Bruno von Mudra

Chief of Staff: Oberst Rudolf von Borries
 33rd Infantry Division (Generalleutnant Franz von Reitzenstein)
 34th Infantry Division (Generalleutnant Walter von Heinemann)

V Reserve Corps 
Commander: General der Infanterie Erich von Gündell

Chief of Staff: Oberstleutnant Ernst von Stockhausen
 9th Reserve Division (Generalleutnant Hans von Guretzky-Cornitz)
 10th Reserve Division (Generalleutnant Hermann von Wartenberg)

VI Reserve Corps 
Commander: General der Infanterie Konrad von Goßler

Chief of Staff: Oberst Richard von Rath
 11th Reserve Division (Generalmajor Karl Suren)
 12th Reserve Division (Generalleutnant Hinko von Lüttwitz)

Other Forces 
 Senior Landwehr Commander 2 (2nd Landwehr Division) (Generalleutnant Adolf Franke)
 43rd Mixed Landwehr Brigade (Generalleutnant Friedrich Wilhelm von der Lippe)
 45th Mixed Landwehr Brigade (Generalmajor Ludolf von Bosse)
 53rd Mixed Landwehr Brigade (Generalmajor Hermann von Oßwald)
 9th Bavarian Mixed Landwehr Brigade (Generalmajor Bernhard Kießling)
 13th Mixed Landwehr Brigade (Generalmajor Georg Saenger)
 4 Mortar Battalions
 2 Pionier Regiments

Sixth Army

6th Army had the following Order of Battle:

Commander: Generaloberst Rupprecht, Crown Prince of Bavaria

Chief of Staff: Generalmajor Konrad Krafft von Dellmensingen

Oberquartiermaster: Generalmajor Bernhard von Hartz

HQ: Saint-Avold, France

Strength: 220,000

XXI Corps 
Commander: General der Infanterie Fritz von Below

 31st Infantry Division

42nd Infantry Division

I Bavarian Corps 
Commander: General der Infanterie Oskar Ritter und Edler v. Xylander
 1st Bavarian Infantry Division
 2nd Bavarian Infantry Division

II Bavarian Corps 
Commander: General der Infanterie Karl Ritter von Martini
 3rd Bavarian Infantry Division
 4th Bavarian Infantry Division

III Bavarian Corps 
Commander: General der Kavallerie Ludwig Freiherr von Gebsattel
 5th Bavarian Infantry Division
 6th Bavarian Infantry Division

I Bavarian Reserve Corps 
Commander: General der Infanterie Karl Ritter von Fasbender
 1st Bavarian Reserve Division
 5th Bavarian Reserve Division

Other Forces 
 Guards Ersatz Division
 4th Ersatz Division
 8th Ersatz Division
 10th Ersatz Division
 5th Bavarian Mixed Landwehr Brigade
 3 Mortar Battalions
 Heavy Coastal Mortar Battery
 Heavy Coastal Gun Battery
 2 Pionier Regiments

Seventh Army

7th Army had the following Order of Battle:

Commander: Generaloberst Josias von Heeringen

Chief of Staff: Generalleutnant Karl von Hänisch

Oberquartiermeister: Generalmajor Ernst von Zieten

XIV Corps 
Commander: General der Infanterie Ernst Freiherr von Hoiningen gen. Huene

Chief of Staff: Oberstleutnant Gottfried von Brauchitsch
 28th Infantry Division
 29th Infantry Division

XV Corps 
Commander: General der Infanterie Berthold von Deimling

Chief of Staff: Oberst Wilhelm Wild
 30th Infantry Division
 39th Infantry Division

XIV Reserve Corps 
Commander: General der Artillerie Richard von Schubert

Chief of Staff: Oberstleutnant Bernhard Bronsart von Schellendorff
 26th Reserve Division
 28th Reserve Division

Other Forces 
 19th Ersatz Division
 Bavarian Ersatz Division
 60th Mixed Landwehr Brigade
 Upper Rhine Fortifications
 55th Mixed Landwehr Brigade
 110th Reinforced Landwehr Infantry Regiment
 1st Bavarian Mixed Landwehr Brigade
 2nd Bavarian Mixed Landwehr Brigade

Eastern Front

Eighth Army

8th Army had the following order of battle:

Commander: Generaloberst Maximilian von Prittwitz.

Chief of Staff: Generalmajor Georg von Waldersee

Oberquartiermaster: Generalmajor Paul Grünert

HQ: Marienburg, Germany

Strength: 225,000

I Corps 
Commander: Generalleutnant Hermann von François
 1st Infantry Division
 2nd Infantry Division

XVII Corps 
Commander: General der Kavallerie August von Mackensen
 35th Infantry Division
 36th Infantry Division

XX Corps 
Commander: General der Infanterie Friedrich von Scholtz
 37th Infantry Division
 41st Infantry Division

I Reserve Corps 
Commander: Generalleutnant Otto von Below
 1st Reserve Division
 36th Reserve Division

Landwehr Corps 
Commander: General der Infanterie Remus von Woyrsch
 Senior Landwehr Commander 3 (3rd Landwehr Division)
 17th Landwehr Infantry Brigade
 18th Landwehr Infantry Brigade
 Senior Landwehr Commander 4 (4th Landwehr Division)
 22nd Landwehr Infantry Brigade
 23rd Landwehr Infantry Brigade

 2nd Mixed Landwehr Brigade
 6th Mixed Landwehr Brigade
 70th Mixed Landwehr Brigade

Other Forces 

3rd Reserve Division
 1st Cavalry Division

Army of the North

IX Reserve Corps is also known as the Army of the North was held back in Schleswig in case of British landings; moved up in late August as part of 1st Army.

The North Army had following order of battle:

Commander: General der Infanterie Max von Boehn

Chief of Staff: Oberst Paulus von Stolzmann

 17th Reserve Division (Generalleutnant Gustav Wagener)

 18th Reserve Division (General der Infanterie Karl Wilhelm von Gronen)
 Senior Landwehr Commander 1 (1st Landwehr Division)
 33rd Mixed Landwehr Brigade
 34th Mixed Landwehr Brigade
 37th Mixed Landwehr Brigade
 38th Mixed Landwehr Brigade
 North Sea Islands

Central Reserves and Border Fortresses
 Strassburg
 30th Reserve Division
 60th Reserve Infantry Brigade
 3rd Bavarian Reserve Infantry Brigade
 10th Bavarian Reserve Infantry Brigade
 Metz
 33rd Reserve Division
 8th Bavarian Infantry Brigade
 66th Reserve Infantry Brigade
 Reserve Infantry Regiment Metz
 Thorn
 35th Reserve Division
 5th Landwehr Infantry Brigade
 20th Landwehr Infantry Brigade
 Königsberg
 9th Landwehr Infantry Brigade
 Ersatz Infantry Brigade Königsberg
 Posen
 19th Landwehr Infantry Brigade
 Graudenz
 Provisional 69th Infantry Brigade

See also 
 German Army order of battle, Western Front (1918)
 Belgian Army order of battle (1914)
 French Army order of battle (1914)

Notes

Sources

 Appendix 6: Order of battle of the German Armies. In: History of the Great War: Military Operations, France and Belgium 1914, by J. E. Edmonds. Macmillan & Co., London, 1922.
 Appendix 1: The Field Army, 17 August 1914. In: Imperial German Army 1914-18: Organisation, Structure, Orders-of-Battle, by Hermann Cron. Helion & Co., 2002.

World War I orders of battle
German Army (German Empire)
Lists of military units and formations of World War I